William Mac McGhee (September 5, 1905 – March 10, 1984), nicknamed "Fibber", was an American Major League Baseball first baseman and outfielder who played for the Philadelphia Athletics during the  and  seasons.

References

1905 births
1984 deaths
Philadelphia Athletics players
Major League Baseball first basemen
Major League Baseball outfielders
Baseball players from Alabama
Minor league baseball managers
Carrollton Champs players
Anniston Nobles players
Galveston Buccaneers players
Augusta Wolves players
Shreveport Sports players
Albany Senators players
Clarksdale Ginners players
Nashville Vols players
Jackson Senators players
Winston-Salem Twins players
Elmira Pioneers players
Meridian Scrappers players
Pensacola Pilots players
Meridian Bears players
Little Rock Travelers players
Gadsden Pilots players
Brewton Millers players
Pensacola Fliers players
Columbia Reds players
El Dorado Oilers players
Pensacola Dons players
People from Valley, Alabama